Guraleus mitralis is a species of sea snail, a marine gastropod mollusk in the family Mangeliidae.

Description
The length of the shell attains 18 mm.

Distribution
This marine species is endemic to Australia and can be found off New South Wales, Victoria and Tasmania.

References

 Adams, A. & Angas, G.F. 1864. Descriptions of new species from Australian seas, in the collection of George French Angas. Proceedings of the Zoological Society of London 1863(III): 418–428, pl. xxxvii 
 Brazier, J. 1889. Notes and critical remarks on a donation of shells sent to the Museum of the Conchological Society of Great Britain and Ireland. Journal of Conchology 6: 66–84
 Pritchard, G.B. & Gatliff, J.H. 1900. Catalogue of the marine shells of Victoria. Part III. Proceedings of the Royal Society of Victoria 12(2): 170–205
 Verco, J.C. 1909. Notes on South Australian marine Mollusca with descriptions of new species. Part XII. Transactions of the Royal Society of South Australia 33: 293–342
 Hedley, C. 1913. Studies of Australian Mollusca. Part XI;  Proceedings of the Linnean Society of New South Wales 38 
  Hedley, C. 1922. A revision of the Australian Turridae. Records of the Australian Museum 13(6): 213–359, pls 42–56 
 May, W.L. 1923. An Illustrated Index of Tasmanian Shells: with 47 plates and 1052 species. Hobart : Government Printer 100 pp. 
 Laseron, C. 1954. Revision of the New South Wales Turridae (Mollusca). Australian Zoological Handbook. Sydney : Royal Zoological Society of New South Wales 1–56, pls 1–12.

External links
  Sowerby, G.B., III. (1896) List of the Pleurotomidae of South Australia, with descriptions of some new species. Proceedings of the Malacological Society of London, 2, 24–32, pl. 3 
  Tucker, J.K. 2004 Catalog of recent and fossil turrids (Mollusca: Gastropoda). Zootaxa 682:1–1295.
 

mitralis
Gastropods described in 1864
Gastropods of Australia